Yusiflər (also, Yusiflar and Yusuflyar) is a village in the Zangilan Rayon of Azerbaijan.

References 

Populated places in Zangilan District